Orliac-de-Bar is a commune in the Corrèze department in central France.

Population

Places and monuments

The Church of Saint-Laurent of Orliac-de-Bar is quoted in historical writings from the 12th century, but was rebuilt in the 15th century. It is endowed with a Gothic portal and treasures classified as historical monuments: The bells, the baroque tabernacle from the 17th century with wings in gilded wood, the statue of the Madonna of Pity of the fifteenth century, the reliquary and the shrine.

See also
Communes of the Corrèze department

References

Communes of Corrèze